The Moon Under Water is the third studio album by American pop/rock singer Ryan Cabrera. It was released on May 13, 2008 in the U.S. The album was preceded by its first single, "Say", which was released in February. It failed to generate success, which contributed in the album's low debut at number hundred seventy-seven (#177) on the Billboard 200, with 8,500 sales in its first week. The next week, the album dropped out of the chart. Therefore, the second single's release date had been moved up to early June, turning out to be "Enemies". Independently, the album sold over 15,000 copies to date.

Track listing 
 "In Between Lights" – 3:56
 "Enemies" – 3:45
 "Say" – 3:37
 "Rise (The Dog Barks)" – 5:20
 "Sit Back, Relax" – 3:41
 "The Tango" – 3:21
 "How Bout Tonite" – 3:42
 "I Shoulda Kissed U" – 3:43
 "Say You Will" – 4:15
 "Please Don't Lie" – 3:24
 "I Will Remember You" – 3:17

Bonus tracks
 "Say" (Drama Remix) [Wal-Mart Bonus Track] - 3:38
 "Enemies" (Acoustic) [Wal-Mart.com Bonus Track] - 4:05
 "Sit Back, Relax" (Ryan Cabrera Remix) [iTunes Bonus Track] - 4:27
 "Enemies" (Dan Remix) [Target Bonus Track] - 3:52
 "Say" (Acoustic) [Target Bonus Track] - 3:43

Charts

References

External links 
 Ryan Cabrera's Official Site
 Ryan Cabrera's Official Street Team
 Ryan's Official MySpace

2008 albums
Ryan Cabrera albums
EMI Records albums